Emil Maurice (19 January 1897 – 6 February 1972) was an early member of the National Socialist German Workers' Party (Nazi Party) and a founding member of the Schutzstaffel (SS).  He was Hitler's first personal chauffeur, and was one of the few persons of mixed Jewish and ethnic German ancestry to serve in the SS, being declared an honorary Aryan by Adolf Hitler in 1935.

Early life and association with Hitler
A watchmaker by trade, Maurice was a close early associate of Adolf Hitler; their personal friendship dated back to 1919 when they were both members of the German Workers Party (DAP). Maurice officially joined the DAP on 1 December 1919 and his party number was 594 (the count began at 501). With the founding of the Sturmabteilung in 1920, Maurice became the first Oberster SA-Führer (Supreme SA Leader). Maurice led the SA stormtroopers in fights that were known to break out with other groups during those early days. Hitler later in his book Mein Kampf mentions one fight in particular from November 1921 where Maurice was at the forefront of the SA unit during the fighting.

In July 1921, Maurice became a personal chauffeur for Adolf Hitler. In March 1923, Maurice also became a member of the Stabswache (Staff Guard), a small separate bodyguard dedicated to Hitler's service rather than "a suspect mass" of the party, such as the SA. It was given the task of guarding Hitler at Nazi parties and rallies. In May 1923, the unit was renamed Stoßtrupp (Shock Troop) 'Adolf Hitler'. Maurice, Julius Schreck, Joseph Berchtold, and Erhard Heiden, were all members of the Stoßtrupp. On 9 November 1923, the Stoßtrupp, along with the SA and several other paramilitary units, took part in the abortive Beer Hall Putsch in Munich. In the aftermath of the putsch, Hitler, Rudolf Hess, Maurice and other Nazi leaders were incarcerated at Landsberg Prison. The Nazi Party and all associated formations, including the Stoßtrupp, were officially disbanded.

After Hitler's release from prison, the Nazi Party was officially refounded. In 1925, Hitler ordered the formation of a new bodyguard unit, the Schutzkommando (protection command). It was formed by Julius Schreck and included old Stoßtrupp members, Maurice and Heiden. That same year, the Schutzkommando was expanded to a national level. It was renamed successively the Sturmstaffel (storm squadron), and finally on 9 November the Schutzstaffel (SS). Hitler became SS member No. 1 and Emil Maurice became SS member No. 2. At that time, Maurice became an SS-Führer in the new organization, although the leadership of the SS was assumed by Schreck, the first Reichsführer-SS. Maurice became Hitler's permanent chauffeur in 1925. Later when Maurice informed Hitler in December 1927 that he was having a relationship with Hitler's half-niece Geli Raubal, Hitler forced an end to the affair. Maurice was dismissed from Hitler's personal service in 1928, but allowed to remain a member of the SS. As chauffeur, he was succeeded first by Julius Schreck and then Erich Kempka.

When the SS was reorganized and expanded in 1932, Maurice became a senior SS officer and would eventually be promoted to the rank SS-Oberführer. While Maurice never became a top commander of the SS, his status as SS member #2 effectively credited him as an actual founder of the organization. Heinrich Himmler, who ultimately would become the most recognized leader of the SS, was SS member #168.

Conflict with Himmler over Jewish heritage
After Himmler had become Reichsführer-SS, Maurice fell afoul of Himmler's racial purity rules for SS officers when he had to submit details of his family history before he was allowed to marry in 1935. Himmler stated, "without question...Maurice is, according to his ancestral table, not of Aryan descent". All SS officers had to prove racial purity back to 1750, and it turned out that Maurice had Jewish ancestry: Charles Maurice Schwartzenberger ( 1805–1896), the founder of the Thalia Theater in Hamburg, was his great-grandfather.

Even though Maurice had been a party member since 1919, taken part in the abortive Beer Hall Putsch, for which he was awarded the prestigious Blood Order, and been a bodyguard for Hitler, Himmler considered him to be a serious security risk given his "Jewish ancestry". Himmler recommended that Maurice be expelled from the SS, along with other members of his family. To Himmler's annoyance, Hitler stood by his old friend. In a secret letter written on 31 August 1935, Hitler compelled Himmler to make an exception for Maurice and his brothers, who were informally declared "Honorary Aryans" and allowed to stay in the SS.

Later life
Maurice became engaged on 31 March 1935 to the medical student – later doctor – Hedwig Maria Anna Ploetz, the daughter of Colonel Rudolf Ploetz. They married on 5 November 1935 in Munich. In 1936, he became a Reichstag deputy for Leipzig and from 1937 was the chairman of the Munich Chamber of Commerce. From 1940 to 1942, he served in the Luftwaffe as an officer. After the war, in 1948, he was sentenced to four years in a labour camp and had 30% of his assets confiscated. In 1951, he owned a watch shop in Munich. He died on 6 February 1972 in Germany.

Decorations and awards
Coburg Badge, October 1932
Golden Party Badge, 1933
Blood Order #495, 1933
SS-Ehrenring, 1933
SS-Ehrendegen, 1933
Honour Chevron for the Old Guard, February 1934
SS Ehrendolch (SS honor dagger)
War Merit Cross without swords
Nazi Party Long Service Award in Bronze, Silver and Gold

References

Notes

Bibliography
 
 
 
 
 
 
 
 
 
 
 

1897 births
1972 deaths
Nazi Party officials
Sturmabteilung officers
SS-Oberführer
German people of Jewish descent
Luftwaffe personnel of World War II
Nazis who participated in the Beer Hall Putsch
People from the Province of Schleswig-Holstein
Chauffeurs of Adolf Hitler
Members of the Reichstag of Nazi Germany
People from Steinburg
Nazi Party politicians
20th-century Freikorps personnel
Nazis convicted of crimes